Neil Douglas Hamilton Simpson  is a British visually impaired para alpine skier who competed at the 2022 Winter Paralympics.

Career
Simpson made his debut at the 2021 World Para Snow Sports Championships where he won a silver medal in the super combined.

He competed at the 2022 Winter Paralympics and won a gold medal in the Super-G and a bronze medal in the super combined.

Simpson was appointed Member of the Order of the British Empire (MBE) in the 2022 Birthday Honours for services to skiing.

References 

Living people
British male alpine skiers
Alpine skiers at the 2022 Winter Paralympics
Medalists at the 2022 Winter Paralympics
Paralympic gold medalists for Great Britain
Paralympic bronze medalists for Great Britain
Paralympic medalists in alpine skiing
Year of birth missing (living people)
Members of the Order of the British Empire
21st-century British people